Oskar Fredriksen may refer to:

 Oskar Fredriksen (cross-country skier) (1909–1991), Norwegian cross country skier
 Oskar Fredriksen (speed skater) (1870–1920), Norwegian speedskater